John Florencio is a Filipino-American classical pianist.

Early life and education
Born in Manila, Florencio studied classical piano at the University of Santo Tomas during his high school years. He graduated from the San Francisco Conservatory of Music with a degree in piano performance.

Career 
Florencio is the co-founder of the San Francisco Academy for the Performing Arts.

Florencio lives in Paris, France, and was part of the founding faculty of American Musical Theatre Live. He was the music director for the 2013 Paris premieres of the musicals Edges and The Last Five Years. In 2016, he was the pianist in London - Paris - Roam !, a one-woman musical show by Sarah Tullamore, at the Paris Fringe and Edinburgh Festival Fringe.

References 

American classical pianists
American male classical pianists
American musicians of Filipino descent
Living people
21st-century classical pianists
21st-century American male musicians
21st-century American pianists
Year of birth missing (living people)